Chouaib Keddad (born 25 July 1994) is an Algerian professional footballer who plays as a defender for CR Belouizdad and the Algerian national football team.

References

External links
 
 

Living people
1994 births
Algerian footballers
Algeria international footballers
CR Belouizdad players
Association football defenders
2022 African Nations Championship players
Algeria A' international footballers